Forest Havoc is a 1926 American silent drama film directed by Stuart Paton and starring Forrest Stanley, Peggy Montgomery and Martha Mattox.

Cast
 Forrest Stanley		
 Peggy Montgomery		
 Martha Mattox		
 Ernest Hilliard	
 Sidney De Gray	
 Harry Todd

References

Bibliography
 Robert B. Connelly. The Silents: Silent Feature Films, 1910-36, Volume 40, Issue 2. December Press, 1998.

External links
 

1926 films
1926 drama films
1920s English-language films
American silent feature films
Silent American drama films
American black-and-white films
Films directed by Stuart Paton
1920s American films